Ramaswamy Ranga Rao (died 27 August 2021) was a prominent Indian mathematician. He finished his Ph.D. under the supervision of C.R. Rao at ISI, Calcutta. He was one of the "famous four"  students of Rao: (the others were K. R. Parthasarathy, Veeravalli S. Varadarajan, and S. R. Srinivasa Varadhan ) in ISI during 1956-1963.

Ranga Rao was professor emeritus of mathematics at University of Illinois. He made fundamental contributions to statistics, Lie groups, and Lie algebras.

After retiring in 2001, he moved to Chennai in 2015. He died on 27 August 2021.

Selected publications
. Russian translation by V. V. Sazonov, Nauka, 1982, . 2nd ed., Robert E. Krieger Publishing Co., 1986, . Chosen as a classic in the SIAM series on applied mathematics.
.

References

20th-century births
2021 deaths
20th-century Indian mathematicians
Scientists from Kolkata
Year of birth missing